Lenka Wienerová (born 23 April 1988) is a Slovak former tennis player.

Wienerová has won ten singles and eleven doubles titles on the ITF Circuit in her career. On 10 August 2009, she reached her best singles ranking of world No. 128. On 2 April 2012, she peaked at No. 158 in the doubles rankings.

ITF Circuit finals

Singles: 19 (10–9)

Doubles: 25 (11–14)

External links
 
 
 

1988 births
Living people
Sportspeople from Košice
Slovak female tennis players
21st-century Slovak women